Arvīds Ķibilds (2 November 1895 – 9 November 1980) was a Latvian athlete. He competed in four events at the 1924 Summer Olympics.

References

External links
 

1895 births
1980 deaths
Athletes (track and field) at the 1924 Summer Olympics
Latvian male racewalkers
Latvian male shot putters
Latvian male discus throwers
Latvian male javelin throwers
Olympic athletes of Latvia
Place of birth missing